Berks is an unincorporated community in Lancaster and Saline counties, Nebraska, United States. The community is located approximately three miles northeast of Crete on the Burlington Northern Railroad Line and one-half mile north of Nebraska Highway 33.

History
Some people hold Berks was the name of an early settler, while others believe the community was named after Berks County, Pennsylvania. The name was also probably chosen to conform with the alphabetical stops on the new Burlington & Quincy Railroad line traveling westward from Lincoln: Berks, Crete, Dorchester, Exeter, Fairmont, Grafton, Huxley, etc. The Berks post office was discontinued in 1912.

References

Unincorporated communities in Lancaster County, Nebraska
Unincorporated communities in Saline County, Nebraska
Unincorporated communities in Nebraska